Christmas Jazz Jam is a Christmas album by Wynton Marsalis that was released in 2009 by Compass Productions. Musicians on the album include Wessell Anderson on alto saxophone, Vincent Gardner and Wycliffe Gordon on trombone, Victor Goines on tenor & soprano saxophone and clarinet, and Herlin Riley on drums.

Background and composition
Christmas Jazz Jam marked Marsalis' first holiday album in twenty years. For the album, Marsalis assembled a group of ten musicians to perform uncredited arrangements of twelve holiday standards. Following "Mary Had a Baby" are traditional New Orleans jazz-style renditions of "Jingle Bells" (James Pierpont) and "Blue Christmas" (Billy Hayes, Jay W. Johnson).

Reception

Kirk Silsbee of the Los Angeles Times awarded the album three of four stars and called the arrangements "smart yet not ostentatious".

In 2009, the album reached peak positions of number six on Billboard Jazz Albums chart, number nine on the Top Holiday Albums chart, and number nineteen on the Top Independent Albums chart. In 2010 the album reached number 125 on the Billboard 200.

Track listing

 "Santa Claus Is Coming to Town" (John Frederick Coots, Haven Gillespie) – 4:50
 "Mary Had a Baby" – 4:03
 "Jingle Bells" (James Pierpont) – 4:43
 "Blue Christmas" (Billy Hayes, Jay W. Johnson) – 5:24
 "Go Tell It on the Mountain" (John Wesley Work Jr.) – 7:08
 "O Christmas Tree" (Ernst Anschutz) – 7:25
 "O Little Town of Bethlehem" (Phillips Brooks) – 7:21
 "Rudolph the Red-Nosed Reindeer" (Johnny Marks) – 6:05
 "The Christmas Song" (Mel Torme, Robert Wells) – 5:30
 "Good King Wenceslas" (Thomas Helmore, John Mason Neale) – 6:49
 "Have Yourself a Merry Little Christmas" (Hugh Martin, Ralph Blane) – 7:08
 "Greensleeves" (traditional) – 2:05

Charts
In 2009 Christmas Jazz Jam reached peak positions of number six on Billboard Jazz Albums chart, number nine on the Top Holiday Albums chart, and number nineteen on the Top Independent Albums chart. In 2010 the album reached number 125 on the Billboard 200.

Personnel

 Wynton Marsalis – trumpet
 Victor Goines – soprano saxophone, tenor saxophone, clarinet
 Walter Blanding – soprano saxophone, tenor saxophone
 Wessell Anderson – alto saxophone
 Paul Nedzela –baritone saxophone, bass clarinet
 Vincent Gardner – trombone
 Wycliffe Gordon – trombone, tuba
 Reginald Veal – double bass
 Herlin Riley – drums
 Dan Nimmer – piano
 Don Vappie – banjo, guitar, vocals
 Roberta Gumbel – vocals
Technical
 Jeff Jones – producer
 Joanne Levey – assistant producer
 Jason Dale – engineer
 Justin Gerrish – assistant engineer
 Fernando Lodeiro – assistant engineer
 Evan Manners – assistant engineer
 Shinobu Mitsuoka – assistant engineer

See also

 Best-selling Christmas/holiday albums in the United States
 Christmas carol
 List of Christmas carols
 Wynton Marsalis discography

References

2009 Christmas albums
Wynton Marsalis albums
Christmas albums by American artists
Jazz Christmas albums